Tun Shin (born 2 October 1948) was Attorney General of Myanmar (Burma) from 2011 to 2016. He is an attorney by profession, with an LLB degree from Yangon, as a Master of Arts degree in business law from London. He is a Christian.

References

1948 births
Living people
20th-century Burmese lawyers
Burmese Christians
University of Yangon alumni
Attorneys general of Burma
Union Solidarity and Development Party politicians
21st-century Burmese lawyers